The NOS Primavera Sound 2018 was held on 7 to 9 June 2018 at the Parque da Cidade, Porto, Portugal. The festival was headlined by Nick Cave and the Bad Seeds, Lorde, and A$AP Rocky.

Lineup
Headline performers are listed in boldface. Artists listed from latest to earliest set times.

NOS

Seat

Super Bock

Pitchfork

Primavera Bits

Radio Primavera Sound

References

Primavera Sound
2018 music festivals
Music festivals in Portugal